The Beaujon Mach .07 is a single-seat, American high-wing, tractor configuration ultralight aircraft. The aircraft is available as plans from Beaujon Aircraft of Ardmore, Oklahoma.

Development
Beaujon Aircraft publishes the plans along with six other designs in book form under the name How to Build Ultralights.

The Mach .07 was specifically designed to comply with the United States ultralight category and its FAR 103 Ultralight Vehicles rules, including the category's maximum  empty weight.

Reviewer Andre Cliche says:

Design
The aircraft's wing and tail structure are built from aluminum and are covered in aircraft fabric. The wing is strut-braced. The Mach .07 uses no structural cables in its construction. The conventional landing gear features a steerable tail wheel attached to the rudder.

The controls are two-axis, with a side-stick that laterally activates the rudder to induce roll and which longitudinally activates the elevator for pitch control. No rudder pedals are installed and the wing construction is greatly simplified by the elimination of ailerons.

The open frame fuselage consists of 6061T6 aluminum tubing and a single open pilot's seat. The powerplant is installed at the front end of the aircraft tailboom tube, above the pilot.

Specifications (Mach .07)

See also

References

External links

1980s United States ultralight aircraft